The candidate information for the Stowmarket (North) Ward in Mid-Suffolk, Suffolk, England. This ward elects three councillors.

Councillors

2011 Results

2015 Results
The turnout of the election was 62.70%.

See also
Mid Suffolk local elections

References

External links
Mid Suffolk Council

Wards of Mid Suffolk District
Stowmarket